"Hard on Yourself" is a song recorded by American singer-songwriters Charlie Puth and Blackbear. It was released as a digital download and for streaming on August 14, 2020 The song was written by Puth, Blackbear and Jacob Kasher.

Background
Before he released the song, Puth said on his Twitter account, "From an Instagram beat I made in 10 minutes...to a full song just a couple weeks later. Hard on Yourself by @iamblackbear and I is out everywhere THIS FRIDAY."

Track listing

Personnel
Credits adapted from Tidal.
 Charlie Puth – Producer, programmer, vocals, writer
 Chris Athens – Masterer
 Serban Ghenea – Mixer
 John Hanes – Mixing Engineer
 Matthew Musto – Vocals, writer
 Jacob Kasher Hindlin – Writer

Charts

Release history

References

2020 songs
2020 singles
Atlantic Records singles
Charlie Puth songs
Blackbear (musician) songs
Songs written by Blackbear (musician)
Songs written by Charlie Puth
Songs written by Jacob Kasher